The eighth series of the British children's television series The Dumping Ground began broadcasting on 10 January 2020 on CBBC and ended on 5 February 2021. The series follows the lives of the children living in the fictional children's care home of Ashdene Ridge, nicknamed by them "The Dumping Ground". It consisted of twenty-four, thirty-minute episodes. It is the 16th series in The Story of Tracy Beaker franchise.

Cast

Main

Guest

Episodes
The series' second half's directors include Hildegard Ryan (4 episodes), Vicki Kisner, and Gary Williams (4 episodes), and produced by Emma Bodger.

References

2020 British television seasons
2021 British television seasons
The Dumping Ground